In geometry, the triheptagonal tiling is a semiregular tiling of the hyperbolic plane, representing a rectified Order-3 heptagonal tiling. There are two triangles and two heptagons alternating on each vertex. It has Schläfli symbol of r{7,3}.

Compare to trihexagonal tiling with vertex configuration 3.6.3.6.

Images

7-3 Rhombille 

In geometry, the 7-3 rhombille tiling is a tessellation of identical rhombi on the hyperbolic plane. Sets of three and seven rhombi meet two classes of vertices.

7-3 rhombile tiling in band model

Related polyhedra and tilings 
The triheptagonal tiling  can be seen in a sequence of quasiregular polyhedrons and tilings:

From a Wythoff construction there are eight hyperbolic uniform tilings that can be based from the regular heptagonal tiling. 

Drawing the tiles colored as red on the original faces, yellow at the original vertices, and blue along the original edges, there are 8 forms.

See also 

 Trihexagonal tiling - 3.6.3.6 tiling
 Rhombille tiling - dual V3.6.3.6 tiling
 Tilings of regular polygons
 List of uniform tilings

References
 John H. Conway, Heidi Burgiel, Chaim Goodman-Strass, The Symmetries of Things 2008,  (Chapter 19, The Hyperbolic Archimedean Tessellations)

External links 

 Hyperbolic and Spherical Tiling Gallery
 KaleidoTile 3: Educational software to create spherical, planar and hyperbolic tilings
 Hyperbolic Planar Tessellations, Don Hatch

Hyperbolic tilings
Isogonal tilings
Isotoxal tilings
Quasiregular polyhedra
Semiregular tilings